Márcio da Silveira Labre (born in Rio de Janeiro on February 27, 1974) is a Brazilian deputy for the state of Rio de Janeiro. He is affiliated with Partido Social Liberal (PSL). He was elected in 2018.
He is anti-communist and an ally of Conservative president Jair Bolsonaro.

References

External links 
 
 

Living people
1974 births
21st-century Brazilian politicians
Social Liberal Party (Brazil) politicians
Brazilian anti-communists
Members of the Chamber of Deputies (Brazil) from Rio de Janeiro (state)
Politicians from Rio de Janeiro (city)